David Ricardo Serrano Gonçalves Sobral (born 11 February 1986) is a Portuguese Astrophysicist, best known for the discovery of galaxy CR-7. He was an Astrophysics lecturer and Reader at Lancaster University from January 2016 to August 2022.

Publications 
 A large H alpha survey at z=2.23, 1.47, 0.84 and 0.40: the 11 Gyr evolution of star-forming galaxies from HiZELS, Monthly Notices of the Royal Astronomical Society in 2013
Evidence for PopIII-like stellar populations in the most luminous Lyα emitters at the epoch of reionization: spectroscopic confirmation, The Astrophysical Journal 808 (2)
Chasing a Starlight: Investigating One of the Oldest Known Galaxies with MUSE

References 

Astrophysics
Living people
Academics of Lancaster University
Portuguese astronomers
Astrophysicists
1986 births